Lastikman, originally spelled Lastik Man, is a fictional character and Filipino comics superhero created by Mars Ravelo and artist Mar T. Santana. Lastikman or the original spelling of Lastik Man debuted in comics format in Aliwan Komiks #56 (December 7, 1964). Based on DC Comics' Plastic Man, and/or Marvel's Mister Fantastic from Fantastic Four, Lastikman can also stretch and transform into many imaginable forms and shapes he desires.

History

Early years (1964-1965)

In the 1965 comic book of Aliwan Komiks "Lastik Man Vol. 1", Lastik Man is introduced as a new comic book superhero, an alien from another planet who somehow got trapped on earth. Lastikman then decided to fight crime in the Philippines, mainly Manila.

Later years (1995-1997)

1995 Issue #1

1995 Issue #3
In Issue #3: "Playground" (October 12, 1995), Lastikman faces the mad toymaker Professor Gilmor.

1995 Issue #4
In Issue #4: "Gold" (October 19, 1995).

1995 Issue #5
In Issue #5: "Lastikman vs Taong Putik" (translated from Tagalog as Lastikman vs Mud Man) (October 26, 1995).

1995 Issue #6
In Issue #6: "Pyrona" (November 2, 1995).

1995 Issue #7
In Issue #7: "Earthquakes" (November 9, 1995).

1995 Issue #8
In Issue #8: "Creatura" (November 16, 1995).

1995 Issue #10
In Issue #10: "Dzuteh" (November 30, 1995).

1995 Issue #11
In Issue #11: "Lastikman Versus Babaeng Kidlat" (Lastikman Versus Lightning Woman) (December 7, 1995).

1995 Issue #13
In Issue #13: "Spektro" (December 21, 1995).

1995 Issue #14
In Issue #14 (December 28, 1995), the final issue featured 2 Lastikman stories.

1996-1997 #Issues
In the 2003 movie version, Young Hilario is near a rubber tree when a meteor strikes it, and somehow gains powers of elasticity. His grandfather inspires him to use his newfound powers to do good deeds, and thus honour the memories of his dead parents. Hilario grows up to become a Professor in physics, and also the superhero Lastikman.

In the 2004 movie version, Young Adrian - a lanky teenager whose father became a drunkard after the death of his mother - was mauled to death by illegal loggers whom he prevented from cutting the trees in the forest. He was left lifeless under a rubber tree, which revived him and gave him special power.

The Mango Comics miniseries (2004)

Costume
The Ravelos commissioned Bong Leal to re-design LASTIKMAN's costume for the 2007 TV series.

Powers and abilities

In other media

Television

For More Information, See: Lastikman (TV series)
Mars Ravelo's Lastikman (2007)
Starring: Vhong Navarro as Lastikman/his human counterpart Miguel Asis/Eskappar, an import from the planet Harraio, Iya Villania as Yellena White, Cherie Gil as Ayessa White/Frosta, John Estrada as Dr. Jared Evilone/Elemento, Jason Gainza as Caloy Asis, Ian Veneracion as Agaddon, and Danilo Barrios as Ryan White/Lagablab
Produced by: ABS-CBN
Directed by: Chito S. Rono/Jerome Pobocan/Tots Mariscal
Date Released: September 24, 2007

Films

Mars Ravelo's Lastik Man (1965)
The first to play the title role was Von Serna, the dad of Snooky Serna, in 1965.

Lastikman (2003)
Lastikman is the second film adaptation of the character, written and directed by Tony Y. Reyes. It stars Vic Sotto as Lastikman/Larry, Donita Rose as Linda, Michael V., Jeffrey Quizon as Stryker/Jepoy, Michelle Bayle, Anne Curtis as young Linda, Ryan Eigenmann, Elizabeth Oropesa, Evangeline Pascual, Joonee Gamboa and Oyo Boy Sotto as young Larry. Produced by Sotto's M-ZET TV Production, the film was released through OctoArts Films on January 1, 2003, as part of the 28th Metro Manila Film Festival.

Lastikman (2004)
Mars Ravelo's Lastikman: Unang Banat (lit. 'Mars Ravelo's Lastikman: The First Stretch'), or simply Lastikman: Unang Banat, is directed by Mac Alejandre and written by RJ Nuevas. It stars Mark Bautista as Lastikman/Adrian Rosales, Sarah Geronimo as Lara Manuel, Cherie Gil as Lastika, John Estrada as Taong Aso, Danilo Barrios as Reden/Taong Aso, Elizabeth Oropesa, Joel Torre, Mark Gil, Bearwin Meily and Tuesday Vargas. The film was released through Viva Films on December 25, 2004, as part of the 30th Metro Manila Film Festival.

Art and literature 
Lastikman Komiks was a 5-Star Komiks Magasin published by Graphic Arts Service, Inc. Edited by Vic Soriano, it was published from September 28 – December 28, 1995. Its title was based on Mars Ravelo's original character Lastikman, who first appeared in the pages of Aliwan Komiks.

Collected editions

See also
Isang Lakas
List of Filipino superheroes

References

External links

Lastikman at the International Catalogue of Superheroes
Comic Vine - Comic Vine is the largest comic book wiki in the universe.
Mango Comics
Stretching the concept of the Pinoy superhero
LASTIKDOG - Lastikman's Best Friend
Philippine Comics - The most comprehensive library of Filipino comics on the internet.

Lastikman
1964 comics debuts
Comics adapted into television series
Comics characters introduced in 1964
Comics characters with superhuman strength
Fictional characters who can stretch themselves
Fictional Filipino people
Filipino comics characters
Filipino superheroes
Male characters in comics
Philippine comics adapted into films
Philippine comics titles